Rob May (born 15 February 1969, in London) is a musician, songwriter and record producer.

May co-founded and toured with Beehive, who won a MOBO Best Gospel Act award in 1997 for their self-produced album, Brand New Day.

He has played keyboards for a number of acts including Honeyz, Misteeq, 911, Louise and Lulu. Production and mix credits include Alex Parks, Moya Brennan, RyanDan, Will Martin and Connie Talbot. He produced Connie Talbot’s ‘Over The Rainbow’, which achieved Gold status in the UK as well as Platinum Sales in Asia. The single ‘Three Little Birds’ reached number 1 in the US Billboard Hot Singles Sales chart.

TV writing and production credits include: "Good Morning Britain, Lingo, 5 Gold Rings, Lorraine, Inside Out, Daybreak CNN, When Jordan met Peter, Toughest Place To Be A..., Sunday Morning Live, Janet Saves The Monarchy and Wogan Now & Then. He has also written and produced the theme tunes for Setanta Sports' Premiership, FA Cup and World Cup 2010 Football programmes. He has composed and produced the audio branding for UEFA Euro Qualifiers, FIFA Women's World Cup, Guinness ICC, Jeem TV, Setanta Sports, Forces TV, NRT, Associated Press,Fame Academy 2 and Celebrity Fame Academy. He has composed and produced the Official Broadcast Theme for the 2010 Vancouver Winter Olympics called "City of Ice". In 2011, he produced and re-arranged the official FIFA anthem. Recently he has composed the official CONCACAF Nations League Theme, FIFA Africa Qualifiers, Basketball Champions League and Champions Hockey League Anthems.

References

1969 births
Living people
Musicians from London
English songwriters
English keyboardists
English funk musicians